Wikstroemia retusa (Ao ganpi) is a shrub native to Japan, Taiwan and the Philippines, used for making paper since the 8th century.

References

Flora of Japan
retusa
Flora of the Philippines
Flora of Taiwan
Papermaking